Crisis in Mid-air is a 1979 US made for TV movie. Unlike other airport disaster films popular in the 1970s, it concentrates on the stresses at Air Traffic Control. Crisis in Mid-air was shot partially on location at the Los Angeles International Airport (LAX) Terminal Area/Approach Radar Control (TRACON) Center.

Plot
Air Traffic Controller Nick Culver (George Peppard) has been suffering recurring nightmares where a military pilot is intentionally switching off his transponder signal. He subsequently intrudes into the airspace of civilian flights Nick is controlling, causing an air collision. He wakes up terrified and his wife Betsy (Karen Grassle) advises him to see a doctor, and to find a less stressful job.
 
Nick, in his late 50s, working as an LAX Air Traffic Controller, feels trapped in his job. The stress is affecting his mental and physical health. He is driven to prove himself despite his years. His nightmare turns real as he experiences an accident similar to his dream. After the incident, the civilian flight passengers are all dead, and the military pilot has bailed out and survived. During the inquiry, the pilot lies about his actions. As a final hearing approaches, Nick's career is in danger. He smokes and drinks coffee incessantly, and begins to take pills to calm his nerves.

There follows a confrontation with Brian Haley (Greg Morris), the employee the authorities have used to try to frame Nick by blaming the accident on his mistake. Nick replies that the employee is a bitter "washed-out" pilot who seeks revenge on the aviation industry.

Nick's stress continues at work. After working in Chicago, Tim Donovan (Desi Arnaz, Jr.), a young controller, is posted to LAX  with Nick becoming his instructor. The two generations strongly clash with each other. The young controller is more relaxed and not conscious of the particular difficulties he may face while the older and experienced instructor knows that any moment can produce a situation that pushes adrenaline to its highest. When  Maggie Johnson (Margie Impert), a young trainee panics, she realizes that she cannot handle the stress.

The climax of Nick's stress comes with the arrival of the psychologist Dr. Eric Denvers (Martin Milner).  Frank Piovano (Michael Constantine) as the head of the Civil Aviation Authority in Los Angeles had sent for the psychologist. Brad Mullins (Dana Elcar), as the head of the controllers, wants to closely watch the controllers as some of them are reported to have problems and there is fear for consequences in air safety. The presence of Dr. Denvers increases the stress as everyone knows that if detected to be mentally unstable, the controller will lose his job.

Nick explains all the  tricks of  the trade to the psychologist including why even rules have to bend to allow traffic to keep on going instead of queuing for long periods on the ground. He also informs Dr. Denvers that controllers' personal life should not be under review. In Donovan's training, his actions nearly cause a collision that is averted at the last minute by Nick taking control. Even in this stressful situation, he corrects automatically while his face reflects his tremendous anxiety. At Nick's hearing, his accumulated anxiety results in a family breakup with Betsy leaving him.

At LAX, Piovano not only has his controllers to worry about but a series of murders of taxicab drivers that work out of LAX, is extremely troubling. Billy Coleman (Fabian), an airport worker at LAX, who has lost his mind after a cab driver killed his child, is the killer. While trying to escape from the police, he rams a bus into the radar installations, destroying the airport's radar.

Using only their memory and information on paper strips alone, the controllers in the operations room will have to continue without radar. At this crucial moment, Nick works together with Donovan to successfully handle incoming flights. Nick is then informed that Betsy is on a flight already in the air, but that an engine failure has crippled the airliner forcing an immediate landing. In the chaos, Nick trusts Donovan to take charge while he rushes to the airfield to provide help. The bus with the crazed airport worker blocks the runway but Nick joins Piovano to get on the bus to disarm Coleman, and with the disabled airliner in landing approach, he drives the bus away, clearing the runway, as Flight 802 misses it by inches.

After escaping the danger, Betsy returns to Nick's arms and at this moment Haley comes and tells Nick that after a witness came forward who saw the military jet doing aerobatics, Nick is "off the hook". Turning to Betsy, Nick promises to quit his post and return to a normal life.

Cast

 George Peppard as Air Traffic Controller Nick Culver
 Karen Grassle as Betsy Culver, Nick's wife
 Desi Arnaz Jr. as Tim Donovan
 Dana Elcar as Brad Mullins
 Martin Milner as Dr. Eric Denvers
 Fabian as Billy Coleman
 Michael Constantine as Frank Piovano
 Greg Morris as Brian Haley
 Alan Fudge as Bret "Scotty" Loebner
 Denise DuBarry as Jenny Sterling (Credited as Denise Du Berry)
 Don Murray as Adam Travis
 Margie Impert as Maggie Johnson (credited as Margaret Impert) .

Production
Despite a number of films that have shown the inside of Air Traffic Control work, when most of the others involve fictitious scenes of very often implausible and highly inaccurate content, Crisis in Mid-air is the most authentic ever in its realism and accuracy. For a month, to realistically portray the stresses of their work, Peppard had followed the shifts at LA TRACON. LAX by the late 1960s was one of busiest airports in North America.

The air traffic scenes at LAX are very impressive and well shot. The call sign of the air carrier used in the scenario for the flight GL802, although real on the radar screen, corresponds to a fictitious one, called "Globol" in the film.

Fabian has one of his later film roles.

Aircraft in the film
The types of aircraft include many of those flying in the 1970s with quite a variety of airlines that use LAX until today. These civil types include: Boeing 727-22 c/n 18310/48, N7078U, McDonnell Douglas DC-10-10F c/n 46608/25, N1808U, British Aerospace 125-600A. c/n 256001, N711AG, Boeing 720-022 c/n 18077/265, N7224U, Beechcraft D35 Bonanza and Piper PA-28 Cherokee 235 Pathfinder. One military type also figures prominently, the North American F-100 Super Sabre.

Reception
Crisis in Mid-air was the 57th most popular program of the week it aired.

References

Notes

Citations

Bibliography

 Schoneberger, William A., Ethel Pattison, Lee Nichols and Flight Path Learning Center of Southern California. Los Angeles International Airport. Charleston, South Carolina: Arcadia Publishing, 2009. .

External links
 
 
 Crisis in Mid Air at TCMDB

American television films
1979 television films
1979 films
American aviation films
Films directed by Walter Grauman
1970s American films